Didier R.G.G. de Chaffoy de Courcelles (born 19 November 1952, in Turnhout) is a Belgian scientist and businessman. He was senior vice president of Drug Discovery Europe, and Johnson & Johnson Pharmaceutical Research & Development (J&JPRD), a division of Janssen Pharmaceutica (Beerse, Belgium), until 2008 when he left the company.

Education
Didier de Chaffoy de Courcelles went to highschool at the Broeders van Liefde in Turnhout. He obtained a Bachelor of Science degree in chemistry from the Katholieke Universiteit Leuven (Leuven, Belgium). He obtained a Master of Science and a PhD of Science (D.Sc.), as well as an accreditation for teaching and research at academic institutions (G.U.O., venia legendi), from the University of Antwerp (Antwerp, Belgium).

Career
He joined the Janssen Research Foundation in 1981, where he became Director of Biochemistry, Senior Director of Pharmacology, Vice President of Biological Research, and Senior Vice President of Discovery Research until 2008. In addition, he was a member of the J&JPRD Board (Raritan, New Jersey, United States), the board of directors of Janssen Pharmaceutica (Beerse, Belgium) and the Sir James Black Foundation (London, United Kingdom). In 2009 he founded his own company Oto Therapeutics and started teaching at Hasselt University.

See also
 Paul Janssen, founder of Janssen Pharmaceutica

Sources
 Janssen Pharmaceutica
 Didier de Chaffoy de Courcelles
 De aspirine zou vandaag nooit meer goed gekeurd geraken (Article in Trends)

1953 births
Living people
Belgian businesspeople
Belgian pharmacologists
Businesspeople in the pharmaceutical industry
Janssen Pharmaceutica people
People from Turnhout
University of Antwerp alumni